Lake City Way may refer to:

 Lake City Way station, a station on the Millennium Line of the SkyTrain system in Metro Vancouver, Canada
 Lake City Way (Seattle), a street in Seattle, Washington, United States